Cherrybomb is a 2009 British drama film directed by Lisa Barros D'Sa and Glenn Leyburn. It stars Rupert Grint, Kimberley Nixon, Robert Sheehan and James Nesbitt. Filming began on location in Belfast on 7 July 2008, and lasted four weeks. The film includes nudity, drinking, drugs, shop-lifting and car theft. It was released to DVD on 23 August 2010 in the United Kingdom. It premiered in the United States in September 2009 at the Los Angeles Irish Film Festival. The film's theme song is "Cherry Bomb" by The Runaways.

Cherrybomb premiered at the 2009 Berlin International Film Festival, but was initially unable to find a distributor. An online campaign by Grint's fans was credited with helping to secure a deal for distribution in the United Kingdom.

Plot
Malachy McKinny is a straight-A teenager working at the Titanic Leisureplex, a sports training complex owned and run by Dave. His best friend is Luke, a drug dealer living with his drug-addicted father. The two boys find themselves entranced by Michelle, a beautiful and charismatic teen who has just moved from London to live with her father, Dave.

Luke and Malachy attempt to win Michelle's affections by outdoing each other on a wild ride of sex, drugs, vandalism, shoplifting, and fighting. However, all three teens find that they are in over their heads when they throw a party in the Titanic Leisureplex, which turns disastrous when Dave walks in to find his place trashed. Blaming Malachy, he almost beats him to death. Malachy is saved by Luke, who smacks Dave over the head with a pole. Stunned, Dave slowly turns to look at Luke, and receives a second blow to the head. While Malachy is covered in blood and bruises, he gets up and tells Luke that he does not want to leave, since Michelle is grieving for her dead father. Luke, being a "supportive" friend, stays with Malachy until the paramedics and police show up and take them in for questioning.

The ending of the film turns out to be the opening sequence to the film. Although we only see bits and pieces of the ending interrogation, the audience gets to hear of Malachy's and Luke's final words on the incident before the film cuts out.

Cast
 Rupert Grint as Malachy McKinney
 Robert Sheehan as Luke
 Kimberley Nixon as Michelle
 James Nesbitt as Dave, Michelle's father
 Niamh Quinn as Donna
 Paul Kennedy as Chris
 Conor MacNeill as Fanta
 Greer Ellison as Bun
 Kat Kirk as Sharon
 Kathy Kiera Clarke as Emma
 Lalor Roddy as Smiley
 Paul Garrett as Bob
 Paul Caddell as Swimming Instructor
 Richard Orr as Uncle Joe
 Bronach Lawlor as Jessica
 Maggie Hayes as Aunt Maggie

Reception
, the film holds a 42% approval rating on Rotten Tomatoes, based on twelve reviews with an average rating of 4.67/10.

References

External links
 
 

2000s coming-of-age drama films
2009 independent films
2000s teen drama films
2009 films
British coming-of-age drama films
British independent films
British teen drama films
English-language Irish films
Films about drugs
Films set in Northern Ireland
Films shot in Northern Ireland
Irish coming-of-age drama films
Irish independent films
Irish teen drama films
Northern Irish films
2009 directorial debut films
2009 drama films
Films scored by David Holmes (musician)
Films directed by Lisa Barros D'Sa and Glenn Leyburn
2000s English-language films
2000s British films